The Amazon Region Protected Areas Program (ARPA) is a joint initiative sponsored by government and non-government agencies to expand protection of the Amazon rainforest in Brazil.

Foundation

The Amazon Region Protected Areas Program (ARPA) originated in a 1998 promise by the Brazilian government to triple the area of the Amazon that was legally protected.
The program was launched in 2003, supported by government agencies, NGOs and major donors.
The program is based on a major two-year planning exercise with experts from different disciplines, representatives of the indigenous people and others.
This defined a set of priority areas for new parks and reserves throughout the Amazon.

Objectives

Initial objectives were:
 Establish a US$220 million long-term Protected Areas Trust Fund to ensure perpetual financial viability and integrity of the system
Benefits include protecting habitats, ecosystems and biodiversity, reducing conflicts over land ownership, providing sustainable use options to local communities, creating barriers against deforestation and burning, maintaining forest coverage to lock up carbon and avoid changes to rainfall patterns.

Organization

The program is led by the Brazilian Institute of Environment and Renewable Natural Resources (IBAMA), which coordinates the process of identifying protected areas, creating them by law, preparing management plans and establishing staff and infrastructure.
IBAMA works with local government authorities and community members.
Implementation is overseen by a steering committee that includes representatives from government agencies and civil society.

The Brazilian government covers core staffing costs.
The World Bank oversees additional funding, which is managed by the Brazilian Biodiversity Fund (FUNBIO).
Funding is provided by the Global Environment Facility through the World Bank, the government of Germany through the KfW German Development Bank, the World Wide Fund for Nature through WWF-Brazil and the Amazon Fund through the Brazilian Development Bank (BNDES).
Conservation units are eligible for disbursements from the fund only when they can show that they comply with rigorous standards.

Operations

It was approved by the World Bank board on 23 February 2012.
ARPA resulted in a 68% increase in protected areas and indigenous territories from 2004 to 2012.

In February 2016 it was announced that the federal Ministry of the Environment would include the Serra dos Reis State Park, Samuel Ecological Station and Rio Pacaás Novos Extractive Reserve, all in Rondônia, among the conservation areas supported under ARPA.
Rondônia conservation units already covered by ARPA were the Corumbiara State Park, Guajará-Mirim State Park, Rio Preto Jacundá Extractive Reserve, Rio Cautário Extractive Reserve and Serra dos Três Irmãos Ecological Station.
The Umirizal Ecological Station would be created.

Conservation units

Ecological stations covered by ARPA as of 2016 were:

 Terra do Meio
 Maracá
 Maracá-Jipioca
 Niquiá
 Grão Pará
 Jari
 Rio Ronuro
 Rio Roosevelt
 Juami-Japurá
 Rio Acre
 Serra dos Três Irmãos

State parks covered by ARPA as of 2016 were:

 Cantão
 Chandless
 Corumbiara
 Cristalino
 Guajará-Mirim
 Guariba
 Igarapés do Juruena
 Matupiri
 Rio Negro Setor Norte
 Rio Negro Setor Sul
 Serra Ricardo Franco
 Serra das Andorinhas
 Sucunduri
 Xingu

National parks covered by ARPA as of 2016 were:

 Serra da Cutia
 Serra do Divisor
 Serra do Pardo
 Anavilhanas
 Cabo Orange
 Jamanxim
 Jaú
 Juruena
 Rio Novo
 Campos Amazônicos
 Tumucumaque Mountains
 Nascentes do Lago Jari
 Serra da Mocidade
 Viruá

Biological reserves covered by ARPA as of 2016 were:

 Gurupi
 Jaru
 Lago Piratuba
 Maicuru
 Rio Trombetas
 Tapirapé
 Uatumã

Sustainable development reserves covered by ARPA as of 2016 were:

 Itatupã-Baquiá
 Aripuanã
 Amanã
 Bararati
 Cujubim
 Juma
 Rio Iratapuru
 Rio Madeira
 Rio Negro
 Uatumã
 Igapó-Açu
 Piagaçu-Purus
 Rio Amapá
 Uacari

Extractive reserves covered by ARPA as of 2016 were:

 Alto Tarauacá
 Arapixi
 Arióca Pruanã
 Auati-Paraná
 Baixo Juruá
 Barreiro das Antas
 Canutama
 Catuá-Ipixuna
 Cazumbá-Iracema
 Chico Mendes
 Cururupu
 Guariba
 Guariba-Roosevelt
 Ipaú-Anilzinho
 Ituxi
 Lago Capanã Grande
 Mapuá
 Maracanã
 Médio Juruá
 Médio Purús
 Renascer
 Rio Cajari
 Rio Cautário (Federal)
 Rio Cautário (State)
 Rio Gregório
 Rio Iriri
 Rio Jutai
 Rio Ouro Preto
 Rio Preto-Jacundá
 Rio Unini
 Rio Xingu
 Riozinho da Liberdade
 Riozinho do Anfrísio
 Terra Grande-Pracuúba
 Verde para Sempre

Notes

Sources

 
 
 
 
 
 
 

Amazon River
Nature conservation in Brazil
North Region, Brazil
Protected areas of Brazil
Protected areas of Acre (state)
Protected areas of Amapá
Protected areas of Amazonas (Brazilian state)
Protected areas of Pará
Protected areas of Rondônia
Protected areas of Roraima
Protected areas of Tocantins
Environment of Acre (state)
Environment of Amazonas (Brazilian state)
Environment of Pará
Environment of Tocantins